Ichnusomunda is a genus of air-breathing land snails, terrestrial pulmonate gastropod mollusks in the family Hygromiidae, the hairy snails and their allies.

Species
Species within the genus Ichnusomunda include:
 Ichnusomunda sacchii

References

 Nomenclator Zoologicus info

Hygromiidae
Taxonomy articles created by Polbot